Euzophera atuntsealis is a species of snout moth in the genus Euzophera. It was described by Roesler in 1973, and is known from China.

References

Moths described in 1973
Phycitini
Moths of Asia